Richard John Smith  (14 December 1934 – 26 July 2015) was an Australian diplomat.

Smith was born in Tamworth, New South Wales and educated at Sydney High School and the University of Sydney. He worked as a teacher in London in the late 1950s, then as a solicitor in New South Wales, before joining the Australian Department of External Affairs in 1961. He had several postings in the United States, with the United Nations, and in Switzerland.

Smith's first ambassadorial posting was as Ambassador to Israel from 1975 to 1977. He was Ambassador to Thailand from 1985 to 1988, and Ambassador to the Philippines from 1994 to 1996. After serving as Deputy Secretary of the Department of Foreign Affairs and Trade in Canberra, he was appointed as Australian High Commissioner to the United Kingdom from 1991 to 1994.

From 1996 to 1998, he was the Director-General of the Office of National Assessments, an Australian intelligence agency reporting to the Prime Minister. As head of ONA, he was responsible for advising the Prime Minister and the Government on political, strategic and economic developments affecting Australia's national interests.

In 1997, Smith was appointed a Member of the Order of Australia for service to international relations, particularly in the areas of commerce and trade.

He died on 26 July 2015.

References

1934 births
2015 deaths
High Commissioners of Australia to the United Kingdom
Permanent Representatives of Australia to the International Maritime Organization
Ambassadors of Australia to the Philippines
Ambassadors of Australia to Israel
Members of the Order of Australia
University of Sydney alumni
People educated at Sydney Boys High School
People from Tamworth, New South Wales
Ambassadors of Australia to Thailand